The 2021–22 Boston Bruins season was the 98th season for the National Hockey League franchise that was established on November 1, 1924. The Bruins returned to the Atlantic Division after playing in the East Division in 2020–21, due to the Canadian government's COVID-19 border restrictions. On April 16, 2022, the Bruins clinched a playoff spot after a 2–1 win against the Pittsburgh Penguins. They were eliminated in the first round of the playoffs by the Carolina Hurricanes, in seven games.

Standings

Divisional standings

Eastern Conference

Schedule and results

Regular season

Playoffs

Player statistics

Skaters

Goaltenders

†Denotes player spent time with another team before joining the Bruins. Stats reflect time with the Bruins only.
‡Denotes player was traded mid-season. Stats reflect time with the Bruins only.

Transactions

Trades

Notes:
 Boston will receive a 6th-round pick in 2022 if Senyshyn plays at least 5 games with Ottawa during the 2021-22 season; otherwise Boston will receive a 7th-round pick in 2022.

Players acquired

Players lost

Signings

Draft picks

Below are the Boston Bruins' selections at the 2021 NHL Entry Draft, which was held on July 23 and 24, 2021. It was held virtually via Video conference call from the NHL Network studio in Secaucus, New Jersey.

Notes:
 The Toronto Maple Leafs' seventh-round pick went to the Boston Bruins as the result of a trade on October 7, 2020, that sent a seventh-round pick in 2020 (213th overall) to Toronto in exchange for this pick.

References

Boston Bruins
Boston Bruins seasons
Bruins
Bruins
Boston Bruins
Boston Bruins